Casale di Pari is a village in Tuscany, central Italy, administratively a frazione of the comune of Civitella Paganico, province of Grosseto, in the area of the Ombrone Valley. At the time of the 2001 census its population amounted to 176.

Italian comics artist Aurelio Galleppini was born in Casale di Pari.

Geography 
Casale di Pari is about 41 km from Grosseto and 10 km from Civitella Marittima, and it is situated on the slopes of the hill of Pari, near the Ombrone and Farma rivers.

Main sights 
 San Donato (15th century), main parish church of the village, it was restructured in the 18th century.
 Episcopal Palace, a building built in 1573.
 Well of Casale di Pari, ancient well situated in the main square of the village.

References

Bibliography 
 Aldo Mazzolai, Guida della Maremma. Percorsi tra arte e natura, Le Lettere, Florence, 1997.

See also 
 Civitella Marittima
 Dogana, Civitella Paganico
 Monte Antico
 Paganico
 Pari, Civitella Paganico

Frazioni of Civitella Paganico